P. sinensis  may refer to:
 Pelodiscus sinensis, the Chinese soft shelled turtle, a reptile species
 Pseudotsuga sinensis, the Chinese Douglas-fir, a conifer species found in China and Taiwan
 Primula sinensis, the Chinese primrose, a plant species found in China
 Psittacosaurus sinensis, a dinosaur species

Synonyms
 Pergularia sinensis or Periploca sinensis, synonyms for Cryptolepis sinensis, a plant species

See also
 Flora Sinensis